Uranquinty is a small town approximately  south of Wagga Wagga, in the Riverina region of New South Wales, Australia. The population of the town, often referred to as "Quinty", is 909.

Uranquinty was used as the railway village when the railway line was being built from Wagga Wagga to Albury. The founders of the town, Nathan Fleckton and Lauren Fleckton, chose this place as it reminded them of their home farm near the south of England, specifically stating in his personal diary "thy hath land like my motherland, trees of my sky and yet you stand here".

Uranquinty is the home of one of Australia's oldest folk festivals held annually on the October long weekend.

History 
Uranquinty Post Office opened on 15 September 1889.

Uranquinty during World War II 

Uranquinty has a distinguished record in relation to World War II. At the end of 1940 Uranquinty was chosen as the base for No. 5 Service Flying Training School RAAF (5SFTS) for intermediate and advanced training of Empire Air Trainees. Possession of this land was taken under National Security (General) Regulation 54 which existed during the War years.

On 7 April 1942, a Wirraway of 5SFTS crashed during an instrument training flight at the Air Ground Gunnery Range, killing both crew members.

Also during World War II, Uranquinty was the location of RAAF No.17 Inland Aircraft Fuel Depot (IAFD), completed in 1942 and closed on 29 August 1944. Usually consisting of 4 tanks, 31 fuel depots were built across Australia for the storage and supply of aircraft fuel for the RAAF and the US Army Air Forces at a total cost of £900,000 ($1,800,000).

Uranquinty RAAF Post Office was open from 16 December 1941 until 14 September 1946 dating the period of the operation of the base with some accuracy.

Uranquinty Migrant Centre 

The Uranquinty Migrant Centre was established as a result of the Displaced Persons Immigration Scheme that had been embarked upon by Prime Minister Chifley's government at the end of the Second World War as a part of the Populate or Perish policy of the time.

Under Arthur Calwell, Australia's first Minister for Immigration, displaced persons still in camps within Germany, Austria and France were chosen to fill the need for a constant supply of labour to the country. Migrant reception and training centres were established in now disused army and RAAF camps in rural and remote areas such as Uranquinty from 1948, particularly because by then married displaced persons with their families were being allowed entry into Australia. Places like Uranquinty had the space to provide accommodation for the wives and children. Many of these displaced persons worked on the relatively nearby Snowy Mountains Scheme.

One such family that arrived were the Latvian-born Konrads family, two of whom would learn to swim in Uranquinty because their father was afraid they might drown in the numerous dams and creeks in the area. Those two, John and Ilsa Konrads, would set between them 38 individual world records and go on to become Olympic medallists for their adopted country.

A public memorial in the centre of Uranquinty, situated directly on the Olympic Highway, displays information boards and other memorials to the history of displaced persons who stayed in the area during these years.

Uranquinty Camp Post Office was open from 1 December 1948 until 31 March 1959 dating the period of the operation of the camp with some accuracy.

Uranquinty today 
The Uranquinty Folk Festival is held annually on the October Labour Day long weekend. It originated as the Wagga Wagga Folk Festival in 1970 and was held at Downside, until moving to Uranquinty in 1974.

Construction of the $500 million gas-fired power station at Uranquinty was completed in 2008 and was commissioned in January 2009.

Transport 

Uranquinty is located on the Sydney to Melbourne railway line. The station is still officially listed as "in use", but no passenger trains stop there, even by request.

References

External links 
 Uranquinty history
 Uranquinty Folk Festival

Wagga Wagga
Towns in New South Wales
Migrant hostels in Australia